Paradise is a historical novel by the Nobel Prize-winning Zanzibar-born British writer Abdulrazak Gurnah, first published in 1994 by Hamish Hamilton in London. The novel was nominated for both the Booker Prize and the Whitbread Prize for Fiction.

Plot
The novel follows the story of Yusuf, a boy born in the fictional town of Kawa in Tanzania at the turn of the 20th century. Yusuf's father is a hotelier and is in debt to a rich and powerful Arab merchant named Aziz. Early in the story Yusuf is pawned in exchange for his father's owed debt to Aziz and must work as an unpaid servant for the merchant. Yusuf joins Aziz's caravan as they travel into the interior to the lands west of Lake Tanganyika. Here, Aziz's caravan of traders meets hostility from local tribes, wild animals and difficult terrain. As the caravan returns to East Africa, World War I begins and Yusuf encounters the German Army as they sweep Tanzania, forcibly conscripting African men as soldiers.

Literary genealogy

Heart of Darkness
Johan Jacobs claims that Gurnah is writing back to Joseph Conrad's 1902 novel Heart of Darkness. In Aziz's easterly journey to the Congo, Jacobs says that Gurnah is challenging the dominant Western images of the Congo at the turn of the twentieth century that continue to pervade the popular imagination, an idea that is explicitly rejected by James Hodapp, who calls Jacobs's approach "Eurocentric" and accuses him of "ignoring non-European influences almost entirely".

Early Swahili prose
In one scene, Yusuf is serving a group of visitors and listening to their stories in the evening. One visitor relates to the incredulous audience that his uncle travelled to St. Petersburg in the "country of the Rusi", where "the sun shone until midnight" and where the people "were not civilized". This "clearly alludes" to Salim bin Abakari's late 19th-century travel memoir Safari Yangu ya Urusi na ya Siberia (My Journey to Russia and Siberia), written in the late 19th century.

Literary reception
The book was well received on publication. Writing in The Independent, Anita Mason described the novel as "many-layered, violent, beautiful and strange".

In 2022, Paradise was included on the "Big Jubilee Read" list of 70 books by Commonwealth authors, selected to celebrate the Platinum Jubilee of Elizabeth II.

Publication history
1994, UK, Hamish Hamilton, Hardback
2004, UK, Bloomsbury Books, Paperback

Notes

References

1994 novels
English-language literature
Novels set in Tanzania
Books by Abdulrazak Gurnah